Propizepine (brand names Depressin, Vagran) is a tricyclic antidepressant (TCA) used in France for the treatment of depression which was introduced in the 1970s.

Synthesis

Condensation of 2-chloronicotinic acid (2) with o-phenylenediamine (1) leads directly to the tricyclic lactam (3) Although the reaction involves amide formation and nucleophilic aromatic displacement of chlorine, the order of these steps is not known. Alkylation of the anion obtained by treatment if 3 with the 1-chloro-2-dimethylaminopropane (4) affords the antidepressant compound propizepine (5).

The last step in this sequence there is considerable evidence that such alkylations often proceed via the aziridinium ion. Attack of the anion at the secondary or tertiary carbon of the aziridinium ring will lead to different products. Extensive investigation of this problem (e.g. Promethazine, ethopropazine, etc.) has established that the product from attack at secondary carbon usually predominates.

What this intends to say is that even if the chloroamine used is actually 1-dimethylamino-2-chloro-propane, although could still be a mixture of products one still gets predominantly the same reaction product as above and not the "iso" product.

References 

Lactams
Pyridobenzodiazepines
Tricyclic antidepressants